Novosositli is a rural locality (a selo) in Khasavyurtovsky District, Republic of Dagestan, Russia. The population was 1,791 as of 2010. There are 18 streets.

Geography 
Novosositli is located 19 km north of Khasavyurt (the district's administrative centre) by road. Tsiyab Ichichali is the nearest rural locality.

References 

Rural localities in Khasavyurtovsky District